Vincenzo Talarico (28 April 1909 – 16 August 1972), was an Italian screenwriter and film actor. He wrote for 27 films between 1940 and 1966. He also appeared in 15 films between 1946 and 1964. He was born in Acri, Italy and died in Fiuggi, Italy.

Selected filmography

Screenwriter
 A Woman Has Fallen (1941)
 A Little Wife (1943)
 Eleven Men and a Ball (1948)
 The Wolf of the Sila (1949)
 The Devil in the Convent (1950)
 Easy Years (1953)
 The Doctor of the Mad (1954)
 Where Is Freedom? (1954)
 It Happened at the Police Station (1954)
 Toto Seeks Peace (1954)
 Scandal in Sorrento (1955)
 The Bigamist (1956)
 Il Conte di Matera (1957)
 The Moralist (1959)

Actor
 Professor, My Son (1946)
 Where Is Freedom? (1954)
 Toto Seeks Peace (1954)
 A Day in Court (1954)
 An American in Rome (1954)
 The Letters Page (1955)
 The Two Friends (1955)
 The Bigamist (1956) 
 The Moralist (1959)
 I complessi (1965)

References

External links

1909 births
1972 deaths
Italian male screenwriters
Italian male film actors
20th-century Italian male actors
20th-century Italian male writers
20th-century Italian screenwriters